Ding Fuxue (born May 23, 1980 in Yuqing County) is a Chinese slalom canoeist who competed in the 2000s. He was eliminated in the qualifying round of the K1 event at the 2008 Summer Olympics in Beijing, finishing in 21st place.

World Cup individual podiums

1 Asia Canoe Slalom Championship counting for World Cup points

References

1980 births
Living people
People from Zunyi
Sportspeople from Guizhou
Olympic canoeists of China
Canoeists at the 2008 Summer Olympics
Chinese male canoeists